Pure Oil Service Station may refer to:

Pure Oil Station, Geneva, Illinois
Part of the Mooresville Commercial Historic District in Mooresville, Indiana
Pure Oil Service Station (Fairport, New York), see 
Pure Oil Service Station (Hartwell, Georgia)
Pure Oil Service Station (Lavonia, Georgia)
Pure Oil Gas Station, in Saratoga Springs, New York
Pure Oil Service Station, Black Mountain, North Carolina, part of the Black Mountain Downtown Historic District
Pure Oil Station, West Asheville, North Carolina; part of the West Asheville End of Car Line Historic District
Pure Oil Station, Wilmington, North Carolina; part of the Westbrook–Ardmore Historic District
Pure Oil Station, Winston-Salem, North Carolina; part of the Downtown North Historic District
Spring Street Service Station or Pure Oil Service Station, in McMinnville, Tennessee
Pure Oil Company Service Station, Clifton Forge, Virginia; part of the Clifton Forge Commercial Historic District
Pure Oil Service Station, Manning, South Carolina; part of the Manning Commercial Historic District
Freitag's Pure Oil Service Station, Monroe, Wisconsin

See also
 Pure Oil
 Pure Oil Building, in Chicago